The men's parallel bars event was part of the gymnastics programme at the 1928 Summer Olympics. It was one of seven gymnastics events for men and it was contested for the fourth time after 1896, 1904, and 1924. The competition was held on Thursday, August 9, 1928. Eighty-five gymnasts from eleven nations competed, with each nation having a team of up to 8 gymnasts. The event was won by Ladislav Vácha of Czechoslovakia, the nation's first victory in the men's parallel bars. The silver medal went to Josip Primožič of Yugoslavia, with Hermann Hänggi of Switzerland earning bronze.

Background

This was the fourth appearance of the event, which is one of the five apparatus events held every time there were apparatus events at the Summer Olympics (no apparatus events were held in 1900, 1908, 1912, or 1920). Four of the top 10 gymnasts from 1924 returned: gold medalist August Güttinger of Switzerland, fifth-place finisher Mario Lertora of Italy, sixth-place finisher Ladislav Vácha of Czechoslovakia, and eighth-place finisher Bedřich Šupčík of Czechoslovakia. Vácha had won the 1926 world championship as well, and was favored going into the competition.

The Netherlands made its debut in the men's parallel bars. Hungary competed for the first time since 1896. The other nine nations had all competed in 1924. France, Switzerland, and the United States each made their third appearance, tied for most of any nation.

Competition format

Each gymnast performed a compulsory exercise and a voluntary exercise. The maximum score for each exercise was 30 points. The parallel bars was one of the apparatus used in the individual and team all-around scores.

Schedule

Results

References

Olympic Report
 

Parallel bars
Men's 1928
Men's events at the 1928 Summer Olympics